Rastrelliger is a mackerel genus in the family Scombridae.  The three species of Rastrelliger together with the four species of Scomber comprise the tribe Scombrini, known as the "true mackerels".

Species
The three species which comprise Rastrelliger are:

 Rastrelliger brachysoma (Bleeker, 1851) (short mackerel)
 Rastrelliger faughni, Matsui, 1967 (island mackerel)
 Rastrelliger kanagurta, (Cuvier, 1816) (Indian mackerel)

References

External links

 
Marine fish genera
Taxa named by David Starr Jordan
Taxa named by Edwin Chapin Starks